Roy Levesta Jones Jr. (born January 16, 1969) is an American former professional boxer who holds dual American and Russian citizenship. He competed in boxing from 1989 to 2018, and held multiple world championships in four weight classes, including titles at middleweight, super middleweight, light heavyweight, and heavyweight, and is the only boxer in history to start his professional career at light middleweight and go on to win a heavyweight title. As an amateur, he represented the United States at the 1988 Summer Olympics, winning a silver medal in the light middleweight division after one of the most controversial decisions in boxing history.

Jones is considered by many to be one of the greatest boxers of all time, pound for pound, and left his mark in the sport's history when he won the WBA heavyweight title in 2003, becoming the first former middleweight champion to win a heavyweight title in 106 years. In 1999 he became the undisputed light heavyweight champion by unifying the WBA, WBC, and IBF titles. During his prime, Jones was known for possessing exceptional hand speed, athleticism, footwork, explosiveness, punching power, movement and reflexes.

As of February 2018, Jones holds the record for the most wins in unified light heavyweight title bouts in boxing history, at twelve. He is ranked by BoxRec as the 29th greatest pound-for-pound fighter of all time. The Ring magazine named Jones the Fighter of the Year in 1994, and the World Boxing Hall of Fame named him the Fighter of the Year for 2003. He is also a three-time winner of the Best Boxer ESPY Award (1996, 2000, and 2003). The Boxing Writers Association of America named him as the Fighter of the Decade for the 1990s.

Early life
Roy Jones Jr. was born to a family with a boxing tradition. His father, Roy Jones Sr., a Vietnam war veteran who was awarded a Bronze Star for valor after he rescued another soldier. Jones Sr. was a middleweight boxer as well.

Amateur career
Jones won the 1984 United States National Junior Olympics in the  weight division, the 1986 United States National Golden Gloves in the  division, and the 1987 United States National Golden Gloves in the  division. As an amateur, he ended his career with a 121–13 record.

Highlights

 National Golden Gloves (139 lbs), Cedar Rapids, Iowa, May 9–10, 1986:
1/2: Defeated Derrick Rolon by decision
Finals: Defeated Victor Levine by decision
Goodwill Box-offs (156 lbs), Caesars Tahoe, Lake Tahoe, Nevada, April 12, 1986: 
Defeated Stanley Longstreet
 Goodwill Games (139 lbs), Moscow, Soviet Union, July 5–20, 1986:
1/4: Defeated Gordon Joyce (Ireland) by unanimous decision, 5–0
1/2: Lost to Igor Ruzhnikov (Soviet Union) by majority decision, 1–4
 National Golden Gloves (156 lbs), Knoxville, Tennessee, April 17–18, 1987:
1/8: Defeated Anthony Daley
1/4: Defeated George Calderon
1/2: Defeated Donald Giron by decision
Finals: Defeated Ray McElroy by decision

Junior World Championships (156 lbs), Havana, Cuba, June 26, 1987:
1/8: Lost to Andy Liebing (East Germany) by majority decision, 1–4
U.S. National Championships (156 lbs), Olympic Sports Center, Colorado Springs, Colorado, March 29, 1988:
1/8: Lost to Frank Liles by split decision, 2–3
National Golden Gloves (156 lbs), Omaha, Nebraska, May 16–20, 1988:
1/4: Defeated Hiskia Swartz by walkover
1/2: Lost to Gerald McClellan by split decision, 2–3
Olympic Trials (156 lbs), Concord Pavilion, Concord, California, July 5–10, 1988:
1/4: Defeated James Crisp by unanimous decision, 5–0
1/2: Defeated Ray McElroy by majority decision, 4–1
Finals: Defeated Frank Liles by split decision, 3–2
Olympic Box-offs (156 lbs), Caesars Palace, Las Vegas, Nevada, July 16, 1988:

Olympic results

Jones represented the United States at the 1988 Seoul Olympic Games in the 156-pound weight class, being the youngest member of the U.S. Olympic Boxing Team, where he won the silver medal.
 1/16: Defeated M'tendere Makalamba (Malawi) KO 1 
 1/8: Defeated Michal Franek (Czechoslovakia) by unanimous decision, 5–0 
 1/4: Defeated Yevgeni Zaytsev (Soviet Union) by unanimous decision, 5–0 
 1/2: Defeated Richie Woodhall (United Kingdom) by unanimous decision, 5–0 
 Finals: Lost to Park Si-Hun (South Korea) by split decision, 2–3 
Jones did not lose a single round en route to the final. His quarterfinal match-up with Soviet boxer Yevgeni Zaytsev was the first U.S.–Soviet Olympic bout in 12 years (because each country had boycotted one Summer Olympics during that period). The final was met with controversy when Jones lost a 2–3 decision to South Korean fighter Park Si-Hun despite pummeling Park for three rounds, landing 86 punches to Park's 32. Reportedly, Park himself apologized to Jones afterward and the Italian referee Aldo Leoni, while raising Park's hand, told Jones that he was dumbstruck by the judges' decision, murmuring: "I can't believe they're doing this to you." One judge shortly thereafter admitted the decision was a mistake and all three judges voting against Jones were eventually suspended. Marv Albert, calling the bout on American television for NBC, reported that two judges from Communist countries, Hungary and the Soviet Union, scored the bout in favor of Jones, while those from Morocco and Uruguay favored Park. The fifth judge, from Uganda, scored the bout as a draw, leaving the outcome to be decided on other criteria.

An official IOC investigation ending in 1997 found that, although the offending judges had been wined and dined by South Korean organizer's, there was no evidence of corruption in the boxing events in Seoul. Jones was awarded the Val Barker trophy as the best stylistic boxer of the 1988 games, which was only the third and to this day the last time in the competition's history when the award did not go to one of the gold medal winners. The Val Barker trophy is awarded by the AIBA, an organization not directly connected with the Olympic authorities. The incident led Olympic organizers to establish a new scoring system for Olympic boxing.

The U.S. Olympic Committee called for an investigation in 1996 after documents belonging to East Germany’s Stasi secret police revealed reports of judges being paid to vote for South Korean boxers. East Germany ended the Seoul Olympics in second place on the medal table, ahead of the United States by one gold medal.

Professional career

Early years
On turning professional, he had already sparred with many professional boxers, including NABF Champion Ronnie Essett, IBF Champion Lindell Holmes and Sugar Ray Leonard. Jones began as a professional on May 6, 1989, knocking out Ricky Randall in two rounds in Pensacola at the Bayfront Auditorium. For his next fight, he faced the more experienced Stephan Johnson in Atlantic City, beating him by a knockout in round eight.

Jones built a record of 15–0 with 15 knockouts before stepping up in class to meet former World Welterweight Champion Jorge Vaca in a Pay Per View fight on January 10, 1992. He knocked Vaca out in round one to reach 16 knockout wins in a row. After one more KO, Jones went the distance for the first time against future world champion Jorge Castro, winning a 10-round decision in front of a USA Network national audience.

Middleweight champion

Jones vs. Hopkins
Jones made his first attempt at a world title on May 22, 1993. He beat future Undisputed middleweight champion Bernard Hopkins by unanimous decision in Washington, D.C. to capture the IBF middleweight championship. Jones was ahead on all three judges' scorecards (116-112 three times). Jones landed 206 of 594 punches (35%) and Hopkins connected on 153 of 670 (23%). Jones claimed he had entered the bout with a broken right hand, but still managed to outpoint Hopkins and secure a unanimous decision win. Jones reminded the world of this claim on his hit single "Ya'll Must've Forgot" later in his career.

For his next fight, he fought another future world champion, Thulane "Sugar Boy" Malinga, in a non-title affair. Jones beat Malinga by knockout in six rounds. Jones finished the year with another win, beating Fermin Chirino by decision. In 1994, Jones beat Danny "Popeye" Garcia by knockout in six, then retained his IBF title against Thomas Tate in two rounds at Las Vegas on May 27.

Super middleweight champion

Jones vs. Toney

On November 18, 1994, Jones was set to face undefeated IBF super middleweight Champion James Toney, who was ranked highly in the "pound for pound" rankings. Toney was undefeated after 46 bouts and was rated the best in the world at 168 lbs. Billed as "The Uncivil War", Toney vs. Jones was heavily hyped and on PPV. Jones, for the first time in his career, was the underdog.

Over the course of the 12-round unanimous decision, Jones demonstrated his greatness. He danced circles around Toney, utilizing his speed and athleticism to dictate the action, and landing quick combinations whenever Toney pressured him. Jones scored a flash knockdown in the third round with a leaping left hook after goading Toney by imitating a fighting cock. Ring magazine called Jones' performance the most dominant of any big fight in 20 years. Jones landed 285 of 614 punches (46%) and Toney connected on 157 of 451 (35%). Jones was ahead on all three judges' scorecards (117–110, 119–108 and 118–109). The fight generated 300,000 pay-per-view buys.

Miscellaneous defenses
In 1995, Jones defended his super middleweight title successfully multiple times. He began the year by knocking out IBF #1 Antoine Byrd in round one. This was the first time a championship fight took place at Pensacola. In a fight billed as 'The Devil & Mr Jones', he faced former IBF lightweight Champion Vinny Pazienza and defeated him in round six, after knocking down Pazienza three times. In the fourth round, Jones became the first fighter in CompuBox history to go an entire round without being hit by his opponent. Pazienza was credited with throwing five punches and landing zero. Pazienza was guaranteed $1.35 million, while Jones, who worked off percentages of the gate and the pay-per-view revenue, was guaranteed at least $2 million. Jones then beat Tony Thornton in round three by KO three months later.

In 1996, Jones maintained his winning ways, defeating Merqui Sosa by knockout in two and future world champion Eric Lucas in round 11. When he boxed Lucas, he became the first athlete to participate in two paid sports events on the same day. He had played a basketball game in the morning and defended his boxing title in Jacksonville, Florida that evening. He also held a press conference in the ring just before his 3rd bout of the year, taking questions from a chair in the middle of the ring and defending his choice of Bryant Brannon as his opponent instead of Frankie Liles, his nemesis from the amateurs. He then defeated Bryant Brannon in a round two TKO.

Light heavyweight champion

Jones vs McCallum

In November 1996 at Ice Palace, Tampa, Florida, Jones defeated 40-year-old former three-weight world champion Mike McCallum via a shutout decision (120-107, 3 times) before a crowd of 12,000, to win the vacant Interim WBC Light Heavyweight title. Jones scored a knockdown just before the bell at the end of round 10. Jones landed 254 of 535 punches (47%) throughout the 12 rounds and McCallum connected on 209 of 651 (32%) Jones was soon upgraded to full champion by the WBC when former titlist Fabrice Tiozzo moved up to cruiserweight. Jones made $2.8 million from the fight and McCallum got $750,000.

Jones vs. Griffin

In 1997 Jones had his first professional loss, a disqualification against Montell Griffin (26-0, 18 KOs) at the Taj Majal Hotel & Casino in Atlantic City, New Jersey. Griffin was trained by the legendary Eddie Futch, who had taught him how to take advantage of Jones technical mistakes and lack of basic boxing fundamentals. Griffin jumped out to an early lead on Jones but by round 9 Jones was ahead on the scorecards by a point and had Griffin on the canvas early in round nine. But as Griffin took a knee on the canvas to avoid further punishment, Jones hit him twice. Subsequently, Jones was disqualified and lost his title. At the time of disqualification, Jones was ahead on two of the judges' scorecards (75-76, 77-75, 76-75).

Jones vs. Griffin II

Jones sought an immediate rematch five months later at Foxwoods Resort, Connecticut, USA and regained the World Light Heavyweight title easily, knocking Griffin down within the first 20 seconds of the fight, then ending the fight by knocking Griffin out 2 minutes and 31 seconds in with a leaping left hand shot. The fight took place in a bingo hall before a sellout crowd of 4,500. Both Jones and Griffin earned a $1.5 million purse.

Career from 1998 to 2002

In 1998, Jones began by knocking out former light heavyweight and future cruiserweight champion Virgil Hill in four rounds with a huge right hand to the body that broke one of Hill's ribs. Jones followed that with a win against WBA light heavyweight champion Lou Del Valle, by a decision in 12 on July 18, to unify the WBC and WBA belts. Jones had to climb off the canvas for the first time in his career, as he was dropped in round eight, but continued to outbox Del Valle throughout the rest of the fight and gained a unanimous decision. Jones then followed with a defense against Otis Grant. He retained the crown by knocking Grant out in ten rounds.

Jones began 1999 by knocking out the WBC number one ranked contender at the time, Rick Frazier. On June 5 of that year, Jones beat IBF champion Reggie Johnson by a lopsided 12-round decision to become the undisputed light heavyweight champion, as well as the first to unify the WBA, WBC, and IBF titles at that weight since Michael Spinks in 1983. Jones dropped Johnson in the first round and hard in the third round but backed off and allowed Reggie to finish the fight.

The year 2000 began with Jones easily beating the hard-punching David Telesco via a 12-round decision on January 15, at Radio City Music Hall to retain his titles. Jones reportedly fractured his wrist a few weeks before this fight and fought almost exclusively one-handed. He entered the ring surrounded by the famous group of dancers, The Rockettes. His next fight was also a first-time boxing event for a venue, as he traveled to Indianapolis and retained his title with an 11-round technical knockout over Richard Hall at the Conseco Fieldhouse. Jones ended 2000 with a 10-round stoppage of undefeated Eric Harding in New Orleans.

In 2001, Jones released Round One: The Album, a rap CD. That year he retained the title against Derrick Harmon by a knockout in ten and against future world champion Julio César González of Mexico by a 12-round unanimous decision before a crowd of 20,409. The three judges scored it (119-106, 118-107, 119-106) all for Jones. Jones knocked Gonzalez down in rounds one, five and twelve and earned a $1.5 million purse. Jones landed 192 of 375 punches (51%) whilst Gonzalez connected on a very low 91 of 609 (15%).

In 2002, Jones retained his title by knocking out Australian boxer Glen Kelly in seven rounds. Jones put both hands behind his back. As Kelly moved in behind a jab, Jones went over the jab with a right to the head. Kelly went down and was counted out. Jones landed 124 of 249 punches (50%) and Kelly connected on 42 of 171 (25%). Before this bout, Jones was awarded The Ring Championship belt.

Jones then defeated future world champion, WBC #1 Clinton Woods by technical knockout before a crowd of 16,229. He performed a song from his CD during his ring entrance. The bout was stopped in round 6 after Woods' corner threw in the towel. Jones landed 140 of 300 punches (47%) and Woods connected on 39 of 166 (23%).

Heavyweight champion

Jones vs. Ruiz

On March 1, 2003, at the Thomas & Mack Center in Las Vegas, Jones defeated John Ruiz, the man who defeated an aging Evander Holyfield, for the WBA Heavyweight title in front of 15,300 fans. Jones became the first former middleweight title holder to win a Heavyweight title in 106 years. Jones also became the first fighter to start his career as a light middleweight and win a heavyweight title, and the second reigning light heavyweight champion after Michael Spinks in 1985 to move up in weight and claim a major heavyweight championship in his first fight in the division. Jones was guaranteed $10 million against 60% of the profits. Ruiz had no guarantee. He received 40% of the profits, which he had to share with promoter Don King. Jones won on all three scorecards (116-112, 118-110 & 117-111). According to Mark Taffet, HBO's Senior Vice-President of Sports Operations and Pay-Per-View, the fight generated 602,000 pay-per-view buys.

Return to light heavyweight

Jones vs. Tarver

Jones chose to return to the light heavyweight division and on November 8, 2003, he defeated Antonio Tarver to retain the IBO and The Ring Light Heavyweight Championships, win Tarver's WBC title, and win the vacant WBA (Unified) title. Jones appeared a lot weaker after coming back down to the light heavyweight division, losing the muscle he gained for the heavyweight fight seemed to have taken a toll on his aging body and his cat-like reflexes appeared diminished. Jones won by majority decision, the judges giving him 117–111, 116–112 and 114–114.

Fall from grace

Jones vs. Tarver II

On May 15, 2004, Jones faced Tarver in a rematch. Jones was heavily favored to win, but Tarver knocked him down at 1:31 of the second round. Jones had won the first round (Tarver only landed two punches in the first round), but in the second, as Jones tried a combination, he was caught by a big counter left hook from Tarver. Jones got on his feet by the count, but for the first time in his career was ruled unable to continue by referee Jay Nady.

Jones vs. Johnson

On September 25, 2004, Jones attempted to win the IBF light heavyweight title from Glen Johnson in a match in Memphis, Tennessee. Johnson knocked out Jones 49 seconds into the ninth round. Jones lay on the canvas for three minutes after being counted out. Johnson was ahead on all three judges' scorecards at the time of the knockout (77–75, 77–75, 78–74) and had landed 118 punches to Jones's 75. Jones used the ring's canvas that night as a billboard for his upcoming rap CD, which came out November 1.

Jones vs. Tarver III

After almost a year away from the ring, focusing on training and working as an analyst for HBO Boxing, Jones scheduled a third fight with Antonio Tarver, on October 1, 2005, a sellout crowd of 20,895 at the St. Pete Times Forum in Tampa, Florida, which aired on HBO PPV. For only the second time in his career, Jones was considered an underdog going into the fight.

Tarver won by unanimous decision (117–111, 116–112, 116–112) and had Jones out on his feet in the 11th round. Tarver landed 158 of 620 punches (25%) and Jones connected on 85 of 320 (27%). Despite being clearly behind from early in the contest, there was little urgency in either Jones' corner or his performance as he seemed content to make it to the end of the fight following his back-to-back knockout losses.

In the post-fight interview with ESPN's Brian Kenny, Jones said that he would like to fight again. He would welcome a fourth bout with Tarver or another duel with Johnson. The fighters earned in excess of $4 million apiece plus a share of pay-per-view revenues, with the fight generating 440,000 pay-per-view buys.

Fallout with HBO

After the loss in the third Tarver bout, Jones resumed his duties as a commentator for HBO World Championship Boxing, calling the Floyd Mayweather Jr.–Sharmba Mitchell fight on November 19, 2005, and the Jermain Taylor–Bernard Hopkins rematch on December 3, 2005. His return to the network was short-lived, as Jones was let go from his ringside analyst role in January 2006. HBO cited his reported lack of commitment to attending the network's production meetings. Jones returned as a guest analyst for several bouts in 2010, and HBO brought him back the next year as their analyst for Boxing After Dark.

Comeback trail

Back to winning ways

Jones took on Prince Badi Ajamu (25-2-1, 14 KOs) on July 29, 2006, at the Qwest Arena in Boise, Idaho. Jones defeated Ajamu by a unanimous decision (119-106, 3 times), winning the WBO NABO light heavyweight title. Ajamu won the first round on all three official scorecards, however it was the only round he won. Ajamu also lost two points for repeated low blows in round seven and one more in round eight.

Next up for Jones was the undefeated 29-year-old Anthony Hanshaw (24-0-1, 14 KOs), on July 14, 2007, at the Mississippi Coast Coliseum in Biloxi, Mississippi. Hanshaw was ranked 11th by the IBF at super middleweight. Hanshaw was knocked down in the 11th round. Jones won the bout by unanimous decision (114-113, 117-110, 118-109) to claim the vacant International Boxing Council light heavyweight title.

Jones vs. Trinidad

On January 19, 2008, Jones faced former three-weight world champion Félix Trinidad at Madison Square Garden in New York City. Trinidad had also won the WBA Middleweight Title by defeating then Champion William Joppy. The bout was fought at a catchweight of 170 lbs. Jones had a noticeable size and speed advantage, and in round seven, a short right hand to the temple dropped Trinidad to his knees. Jones fired a combination in the tenth round to send Trinidad down once more. Jones won the fight by scores of 117–109 and 116–110 (twice). This was the first time a former heavyweight champion returned to fight successfully at 170 lbs. The fight generated 500,000 pay-per-view buys and $25 million in domestic television revenue. This was also the last fight of Trinidad's career.

Jones vs. Calzaghe

After Joe Calzaghe's split from promoter Frank Warren, it was officially announced that Roy Jones Jr. and Joe Calzaghe had reached an agreement to fight for The Ring Light Heavyweight Championship in New York City at Madison Square Garden on September 20, 2008, on HBO PPV. However, Calzaghe claimed injury to his right hand in training, so the fight had to be postponed a couple of weeks, with November 8 being set as the new date.

In the first round, Jones caught Calzaghe with an uppercut and knocked him down, as well as cutting the Welshman on the bridge of the nose. However, Jones failed to capitalize on the knock down. In the 2nd round Calzaghe began to control the action and dominated Jones throughout the remainder of the fight. As the fight progressed Jones absorbed more and more punishment and suffered a cut over his left eye. Jones' corner, who had never seen Roy cut before, didn't know how to properly handle the situation and blood covered the left side of his face. Ultimately, Jones lost by unanimous decision, winning only one round (10-8 in the first) on the 3 official judges' cards. There was a crowd of 14,152. The fight generated 225,000 pay-per-view buys. It was reported that Calzaghe was paid $10 million from the fight. The fight aired in the UK on Setanta Sports after 4.30am local time, peaking at 500,000 viewers.

Jones vs. Sheika
It was announced that Jones would next fight Omar Sheika (27-8, 18 KOs) on March 21, 2009, at the Civic Center, Pensacola, Florida. Jones defeated Sheika via fifth-round technical knockout to claim the vacant WBO NABO light heavyweight title. The fight was the main event of a pay-per-view titled "March Badness", which included both boxing and mixed martial arts matches. Sheika had previously defeated Glen Johnson, who had knocked out Jones in 2004 and came into this fight having lost six of his last ten bouts. It was only his second fight since September 2005. Jones came in ranked as the #6 light heavyweight in the world by The Ring.

Jones vs. Lacy 

On August 15, 2009, Jones beat former super middleweight champion Jeff Lacy (25-2, 17 KOs) in 10 rounds after Lacy's corner stopped the fight. The fight, billed as "Hook City", going off the boxers' nicknames of 'Captain Hook' and 'Left Hook', took place at the Coast Coliseum in Biloxi, Mississippi. Lacy had never been knocked out or stopped before. Lacy had tried to pin Jones on the ropes throughout the fight, but Jones was unaffected by the tactic and seemed more worried about playing to the crowd than about Lacy's punches. There was a discussion in Lacy's corner after the ninth round about stopping it, but Lacy, convinced his team to give him another round. Jones landed 249 of 500 punches (50%) while Lacy connected on 104 of 429 (24%). Jones was ahead on all three judges' scorecards at the time of stoppage (99-91, 100-89, 98-92).

Consecutive defeats

Jones vs. Green
In December 2009, Roy Jones was set to face Australian boxer Danny Green in Sydney, Australia. In the weeks leading up to this fight, there were reports in the newspapers indicating difficulties getting Roy's sparring partners into Australia. Then on December 2, 2009, following an extensive pre-fight delay due to hand wrap protests, Danny Green defeated Jones via first-round TKO. Jones was initially gracious in his humbling defeat, stating that "We don't make excuses, it was a great performance by Danny." However, less than a month later, Jones would launch a formal complaint, accusing Green of using illegal hand wraps and demanding his loss be overturned, though the decision was upheld. Though Jones' rematch with Hopkins looked to be in trouble following Jones' loss, the two sides would officially come to an agreement in February 2010 for an April 3 bout.

Jones vs. Hopkins II

Roy Jones Jr. and Bernard Hopkins (50-5-1, 32 KOs) met in a rematch bout, on April 3, 2010, at the Mandalay Bay Resort & Casino in Las Vegas, 17 years after their first fight. Jones entered with a record of 5-5 in his previous ten bouts dating back to May 2004 whilst Hopkins came in 4-1 since June 2006. After going the distance, Hopkins was awarded with a unanimous decision (118-109, 117-110 twice). Hopkins landed 184 of 526 punches (35%), while Jones connected on 82 of 274 (30%). Hopkins collapsed to his knees in his dressing room, drained from a brutal fight and exhausted by the end of his 17-year wait for revenge against Jones. The fight generated 150,000 pay-per-view buys.

Jones vs. Lebedev
In February 2011, Vladimir Hryunov confirmed that negotiations were taking place for Denis Lebedev (21-1, 16 KOs) to fight Jones in Moscow. Lebedev had just come off a controversial split decision loss to Marco Huck. At the time, Lebedev was ranked #4 at cruiserweight by The Ring. On 24 March, a deal had been agreed which would see Jones earn a $500,000 purse. The fight, a 10-round bout, which was billed as the "Battle of Two Empires" was announced to take place on May 22 at Dynamo Palace of Sports in Krylatskoye. 2,000 tickets were reportedly sold on the day of release. The promoters expected a sellout.

Lebedev knocked Jones out with 2 seconds left in their 10-round bout. After round 9, the scorecards read (87–84, 85–86, 90–81). The controversy arose when Lebedev punched Jones, when it was, to some, clear that Jones was not responsive and was out on his feet. The final punch put Jones out cold on the canvas and he did not regain his senses for more than 5 minutes amid active medical help. After the bout, Lebedev said that he had nothing to be sorry about. Referee Steve Smoger was also accused of incompetence because he did not stop the fight even though Jones could no longer defend himself which led to Jones taking unnecessary damage. In a statement following the fight, Smoger said, "I didn't stop the fight because there were only a matter of seconds remaining in the fight and it seemed that Roy was pretending, trying to trick his opponent. He did this repeatedly in the fight. So I thought Jones was doing the same thing here, trying to deceive Lebedev in the final seconds of the fight in order to lure Denis in to land a big punch [which Jones managed to do in the previous round]." Jones, when asked about his feelings on the punch responded, "I forgive him".

Cruiserweight

Jones vs. Alexander
Jones won a 10-round unanimous decision against Max Alexander on December 10, 2011, in Atlanta, snapping a three-match losing streak, and winning the Universal Boxing Organisation (UBO) Intercontinental cruiserweight championship. The three judges scored the bout all in Jones' favour (100-90, 100-90 & 99-91). Jones rarely pressed over the first seven rounds but put together several combinations in the eighth and 10th rounds to beat Alexander. After the fight, Jones said, "I'm feeling wonderful. I want a cruiserweight title, the world title", said Jones, who weighed in at 189 pounds. "This is just a start. I'm not through yet." The fight was aired live on Internet PPV channel Ustream for $9.99.

Jones vs. Głażewski
Jones was due to fight Polish boxer Dawid Kostecki (39-1, 25 KOs) in a ten-round bout at Atlas Arena, Poland on June 30. Days before the fight, Kostecki was arrested on June 19 in order to begin serving a 2 and a half year prison sentence for a prior conviction of running a prostitution ring. Jones negotiated his deal with 12 Knockout Promotions, the fight's promoter, he was assured that Kostecki would not start serving his sentence until after the fight. 12 Knockout Promotions tried to secure a temporary release for Kostecki but were unsuccessful. Paweł Głażewski (17-0, 4 KOs), who was on standby all week, stepped in as a replacement. Jones defeated Głażewski by split decision (96-93, 94-95 & 96-94). There was some controversy from the decision. Many believed due to Jones being lined up to challenge then-WBC cruiserweight champion Krzysztof Włodarczyk, he was given the decision.

Jones vs. Benmakhlouf
On December 21, 2013, Jones defeated Zine Eddine Benmakhlouf (17-3-1, 8 KOs) by unanimous decision for the vacant WBU cruiserweight title at the Dynamo Palace of Sports in Krylatskoye in Moscow, Russia. The fight was billed as a "Winner Takes All" match, with the winner receiving the entire purse. Benmakhlouf took a knee after Jones wobbled him with a left hook early in the third round. The judges scored the bout 120-108, 119-109 and 118-111.

Miscellaneous fights
Jones, fighting at the Ķīpsala International Exhibition Centre in Latvia, defeated Courtney Fry (18-5-0) via RTD in the 5th round on July 26, 2014. Jones was ahead on all three judges scorecards by the end of the fourth round, (50-44, 50-44 & 50-45). On September 26, 2014, Jones defeated Hany Atiyo via 1st-round KO after 75 seconds. This fight took place in front of a sold-out crowd at The Basket Hall in Krasnodar, Russia. This was a second straight stoppage and fifth consecutive victory for Jones. Jones' next bout, for the first time 4 years, took place in USA at the Cabarrus Arena in Concord, North Carolina, and ultimately saw him defeat Willy Williams via 2nd-round TKO. Near the end of the same month on March 28, Jones was again back in the ring, this time against Paul Vasquez (10-6-1, 3 KOs), defeating him via 1st-round TKO for the WBU (German Version) cruiserweight title at the Pensacola Bay Center in Florida. On August 16, 2015, Jones scored his 62nd professional victory and 45th knockout win by defeating Eric Watkins via 6th-round KO.

Jones vs. Maccarinelli

On October 28, 2015, it was announced that Jones would be fighting former WBO cruiserweight champion Enzo Maccarinelli, 35, who had a career record of 40 wins and 7 losses, for the WBA 'super' world cruiserweight title. However, this was a 'false rumour'. It was however announced that they would fight on December 12, 2015, in a non-title cruiserweight battle. This was Jones' first fight since being granted Russian citizenship and he was going into it with 8 straight victories, with the last 4 inside the distance. The fight took place at the VTB Ice Palace in Moscow.

After an evenly matched 3 rounds, the 4th round started more in Maccarinelli's favour. Halfway through the round, Maccarinelli dropped Jones with an uppercut. Jones beat the count and carried on for 10–12 seconds more with his gloves to his face, eating several more uppercuts. Against the ropes, he then absorbed a huge right hook which caused him to stiffen and fall face down on the canvas. Referee Ingo Barrabas waved off the fight in what was Jones' 9th career defeat, the 5th by KO.

Jones vs. Phillips
On March 20, 2016, Jones fought in Phoenix, Arizona, at the Celebrity Theatre against 33-year-old MMA fighter Vyron Phillips, who had won the right to fight him after having been selected through a vote on Facebook. Phillips, who fought in his first boxing match, was 5-3 in MMA bouts and 6-1 as an amateur boxer. Phillips would have received $100,000 if he had knocked Jones out, but was knocked down in the second round by Jones. The referee then stopped the fight.

Jones vs. Moore
Square Ring Promotions announced on July 29, Jones would return to his hometown, Pensacola Bay Center in Pensacola, Florida, on August 13 against journeyman "Rockin'" Rodney Moore (17-11-2, 7 KOs) in a cruiserweight bout. The fight headlined the "Island Fights 38" card, an ongoing series that combines boxing matches and MMA bouts on the same show. Jones last fought in Pensacola in March 2015, when he knocked out Paul Vasquez in the first round. Moore did not fight between 2005 and 2012 and has lost nine consecutive fights, although only one of them came by knockout. That was a second-round stoppage to top cruiserweight contender Murat Gassiev 13 months ago. On fight night, in front of more than 5,000 fans in attendance, in a slow-paced affair, Jones won a one-sided 10 round unanimous decision with shutout scores of 100-90 on all three cards.

It was noted that Jones incurred a tear in his right biceps in round five and fought the rest of the bout one handed and admitted after the bout the healing time required for his torn right biceps probably meant the end of his long career. In October, Jones stated his intentions to continue fighting on and not retiring from the sport.

Jones vs. Gunn
On December 2, 2016, David Feldman Promotions confirmed a fight between Jones and undefeated bare-knuckle fighter and former world title challenger Bobby Gunn would be announced for February 17, 2017, for the vacant World Boxing Foundation Cruiserweight championship at a press conference on December 6 at the Chase Center in Delaware. At the time of announcement, Gunn was a former IBA cruiserweight champion and bare-knuckle heavyweight champion, with a record of 72-0 with 72 knockouts. The fight was made official at the press conference on December 7. Jones spoke of his long-awaited desire to fight Gunn, "I always do things that people don't expect me to do. I promised Bobby a long time ago that I would give him the opportunity, and I am a man of my word. Come February 17th, I am going to shock the world again." At the official weigh-in Jones came in 199 pounds and Gunn weighed in lighter at 197.4 pounds. In a slow-paced fight, Jones stopped Gunn in the beginning of the 8th round, before Gunn had even left his corner, to win the vacant World Boxing Foundation cruiserweight title. Gunn injured his nose and was out boxed by Jones throughout seven rounds. In the post fight, Jones and Gunn both embraced.

Jones spoke about his desire to continue his boxing career further, "Anything is possible, I'm not going to make an immediate decision. Why would I stop when I looked that good though?... I want a shot at a cruiserweight title ... I do intend on fighting and we'll see what happens in the future. I looked good." Jones later told On The Ropes Boxing Radio, "Yeah I think it's my last year in boxing, and I tell people all the time." Hinting he may retire at the end of 2017. On December 3, 2017, after Miguel Cotto's farewell fight re-iterated his desire to continue boxing.

Retirement

Jones vs. Sigmon 
On December 30, 2017, Jones announced that he would return to the Bay Center in Pensacola, Florida to headline the Island Fights 46 on February 8, 2018. Jones had previously headlined Island Fights, which is a show that included both boxing and MMA bouts. Speaking of the event, Jones said, "My last day at the Bay. It's my last one for the bayfront ... Civic Center, Pensacola, Bayfront Arena, whatever you want to call it. So if you want to come to see my last day in Pensacola, be there February 8. That's my last one there." He stated it would be his final fight. Jones announced Scott Sigmon (30-11-1, 16 KOs) as his opponent for the 10 round bout. Jones ended his boxing career defeating Sigmon via a one-sided 10 round unanimous decision, also winning the vacant World Boxing Union cruiserweight title in the process. All three judges scored the fight 98-92 in favour of Jones. Jones started off the better boxer landed upper cuts and hooks and remained in control throughout the fight. Jones landed an uppercut in round 5 which knocked Sigmon's mouthpiece out. In round 6, Sigmon began throwing more punches, although they were weak combinations easily blocked by Jones. Jones was also able to counter most of the shots Sigmon threw.

After the fight, Jones stated he had fought with a bicep injury. He also called for a boxing match against 42-year-old former UFC middleweight champion Anderson Silva. In the post-fight interview, he said, "I knew Scott was tough, I knew Scott was game and I knew Scott would keep coming. However, I don't make excuses, but last week I tore my biceps in my left arm again and I refused to pull out. Other than that [fight], chapter closed." Jones retired after 75 professional fights over 29 years; 66 wins, 47 coming inside the distance and 9 losses.

Jones vs. Pettis 

On February 6, 2023, it was announced that Jones would take on former UFC and WEC Lightweight Champion Anthony Pettis on April 1. The bout is set to take place is in Milwaukee, Wisconsin, the hometown of Pettis.

Exhibition bout

It was announced in July 2020 that Jones had signed a contract to face former undisputed heavyweight champion, Mike Tyson, in an eight-round exhibition fight. The bout—officially sanctioned by the California State Athletic Commission (CSAC)—was initially scheduled to take place on September 12 at the Dignity Health Sports Park in Carson, California, however, the date was pushed back to November 28 in order to maximize revenue for the event. The fight lasted the full 8 rounds, and was declared a draw.

Personal life
Jones was born in Pensacola, Florida. His mother, Carol, was warm and easy-going, whereas his father, Roy Sr., was much like a Marine Drill Instructor with respect to his son. A decorated Vietnam veteran, ex-club fighter and retired aircraft engineer who had taken up hog farming, Roy Sr. was harsh on his son from early on, taunting the child, "sparring" with him, enraging him, yelling at him and abusing him, often for 20 minutes at a time. Roy Jr. lived in constant fear of his father's verbal and physical violence against him.

Jones described his childhood in Sports Illustrated: "After a while I didn't care about gettin' hurt or dyin' anymore. I was in pain all day, every day, I was so scared of my father. He'd pull up in his truck and start lookin' for something I'd done wrong. There was no escape, no excuse, no way out of nothin'. ... Getting' hurt or dyin' might've been better than the life I was livin'. ... Used to think about killin' myself anyway."

Roy Sr. ran his own boxing gym, to which he devoted all his available time and financial resources. He offered direction to numerous youths and steered many of them away from trouble. Roy Sr. did everything possible to expand the program and help more kids. But toward his own son he was merciless, driving Roy Jr. to the brink of exhaustion, screaming at him in front of all the other fighters and assaulting him."

Using his birds as an image for his own predicament, Jones said in the same Sports Illustrated piece: "I spent all my life in my dad's cage. I could never be 100 percent of who I am until I left it. But because of him, nothing bothers me. I'll never face anything stronger and harder than what I already have."

On August 19, 2015, Roy Jones Jr. met with Vladimir Putin in Sevastopol, Crimea, to ask for Russian citizenship. Jones stated that he often visited Russia for business activity, and a passport would avoid inconvenient rides. Jones was granted Russian citizenship on September 12. He was banned from entering Ukraine after arriving to Russian-occupied Crimea from Russia.

Jones and his wife have three children. Their eldest son, Roy III, played basketball at Findlay Prep in Henderson, Nev.

Fighting style
Jones was known for his unique and unorthodox fighting style that defied many of boxing's oldest traditions. His style relied heavily on his great hand speed, quickness, reflexes, ring IQ and knockout power which were often the deciding factors in most of his fights during his prime. He had such hand speed that he could often throw hooks in rapid succession. He was nicknamed "Captain Hook", because he would deliver four or five hooks in a row from different angles. But he would also mix it up with a variety of punches to keep his opponents guessing.

Jones' style often saw him with his hands down and relying on head movement to evade his opponent's punches. He used his cat-like reflexes to bob and weave, slip and counter his opponent. Jones was a master at this sort of style, and used this to his advantage by sticking his chin out to bait his opponents into hitting him, only to pull back and counter the off-balance opponent with his own punches.

He also rarely led with the jab and instead was known for leading with leaping left hooks or the right cross. Immediately after his second fight with Montell Griffin, former heavyweight champion George Foreman remarked that Jones did not need a jab to setup his punches due to his extraordinary quickness and that he is probably the only boxer in history he could say that about. He has also been quoted as saying that Jones, "hits like a heavyweight and moves like a lightweight."

Jones is also said to have integrated cockfighting into his boxing style, often using exaggerated feints to catch his opponents off-balance. He also had the ability to land punches from odd angles that his opponents failed to see and his unusual style was very difficult to adjust to for most opponents who often struggled to find sparring partners that could mimic his unique style. Boxer Montell Griffin, who faced Jones twice at 175 lbs and sparred with Floyd Mayweather Jr. at 140 lbs said, "Floyd was no comparison as far as speed. Roy was much faster."

In 1996, High Frequency Boxing's John DiMaio wrote "The early evidence points toward the real possibility that Jones is the greatest talent this sport has ever seen. His skill so dwarfs that of his nearest ranked opposition ... that providing competitive opponents is a more challenging dilemma than the fights themselves." The expert opinion of Boxing magazine's editor, Bert Sugar, is provided on Jones' website: "He possesses the fastest hands in boxing with lightning fast moves and explosive power in both hands." After Mike MacCallum lost the World Boxing Council light heavyweight crown to Roy Jones in a 1996 unanimous decision, he called Jones "the greatest fighter of all time."

Boxing record

Professional

Exhibition

Pay-per-view bouts

Music career

Jones started his rap music career in 2001 with his album, titled Round One: The Album and the debut single, "Y'All Must've Forgot". In 2004, Jones formed a group, Body Head Bangerz and released an album. The album, Body Head Bangerz: Volume One, featured B.G., Juvenile, Bun B of UGK, Petey Pablo, Lil' Flip and Mike Jones among others.

In addition, Jones has made multiple songs regarding Florida State University Athletics. Growing up in the panhandle of Florida, Jones has been a long time fan of Florida State University.

Discography

Album

With Body Head Bangerz

Solo singles
2001: "Y'all Must've Forgot"
2001: "And Still"
2009: "Battle of the Super Powers"

Featured singles
2004: "Can't Be Touched"

Filmography
 Mad TV (1995) - Himself (Episode: #104)
 Married... with Children (1996) - Customer (Episode: Torch Song Duet)
 The Devil's Advocate (1997) – Himself
 The Sentinel (1998) – Sweet Roy Williams (Episode: "Sweet Science")
 The Wayans Brothers (1999) – Himself (Episode: "Rope-a-Dope")
 The Matrix Reloaded (2003) – Captain Ballard
 Enter the Matrix (2003) – Captain Ballard
 Cordially Invited (2007) – Lenny Banks
 Little Fockers (2010) - Party Parent
 Universal Soldier: Day of Reckoning (2012) – Mess Hall Unisol
 Grudge Match (2013) – Himself
 Southpaw (2015) – Himself
 Creed II (2018) – Himself

References

https://m.imdb.com/name/nm1035578/?ref_=m_ttfcd_cl56

External links

Roy-Jones.net 

 

 

1969 births
Living people
African-American boxers
Boxers from Florida
American sportspeople in doping cases
Doping cases in boxing
Olympic boxers of the United States
Boxers at the 1988 Summer Olympics
Sportspeople from Pensacola, Florida
African-American male rappers
Southern hip hop musicians
Rappers from Florida
International Boxing Federation champions
World Boxing Association champions
World Boxing Council champions
African-American male actors
American male boxers
World heavyweight boxing champions
Naturalised citizens of Russia
Medalists at the 1988 Summer Olympics
Olympic silver medalists for the United States in boxing
The Ring (magazine) champions
World middleweight boxing champions
World super-middleweight boxing champions
World light-heavyweight boxing champions
National Golden Gloves champions
Light-welterweight boxers
Russian male boxers
Russian people of African-American descent
21st-century American rappers
Boxing commentators
Goodwill Games medalists in boxing
Competitors at the 1986 Goodwill Games
21st-century American male musicians
21st-century African-American musicians
20th-century African-American sportspeople
People with multiple nationality
International Boxing Hall of Fame inductees